George Roach was a Canadian politician and the mayor of Hamilton, Ontario from 1875 to 1876.

External links
 

Year of birth missing
Year of death missing
Mayors of Hamilton, Ontario